Johnny Campbell (23 July 1928 – 6 February 2015) was an English footballer who played as a winger.

Campbell played league football for Gateshead between 1949 and 1956, scoring 45 goals in 181 league appearances before moving to non-league Consett in 1956.

In 1946 he signed as an amateur for Newcastle United however his career was interrupted due to National Service in the RAF. Following this, he played amateur football for Felling Red Star in Gateshead. In November 1949 he left his employment as a mechanic and joined Gateshead AFC of the Third Division North as a professional player.

He played in Gateshead's famous FA Cup run of 1953 where they reached the 6th round - Liverpool (h) 1–0, Hull City (a) 2–1, and Plymouth (a) 1-0 - an exciting Cup journey before falling to a solitary goal by Bolton's Nat Lofthouse, the Lion of Vienna, in the sixth round at Redheugh Park before a crowd of 17,692.

Sources

1928 births
English footballers
Association football wingers
Gateshead F.C. players
English Football League players
2015 deaths
Consett A.F.C. players